Stretton is a surname. Notable people with the surname include:

Alan Stretton (1922–2012), Australian Army officer
Alan M. Stretton (born 1930s), Australian civil engineer
Amanda Stretton (born 1973), English racing driver and motoring journalist
Andrea Stretton (1952–2007), Australian arts journalist and television presenter
Antony Stretton, English neuroscientist active in the United States
Clement E. Stretton (1850–1915), English engineer, author, railway collector, and supporter of Operative Masonry 
Gordon Stretton (1887–1982), English-born Welsh-African-descended drummer active in the United Kingdom, France, and Argentina
Hesba Stretton, the pen name of Sarah Smith (1832–1911), English writer of children's books
Hugh Stretton (born 1924), Australian historian and professor
Pamela Stretton (born 1980), South African artist
Philip Eustace Stretton (1865–1919), British painter
Robert de Stretton (fl. mid-1300s), English clergyman
Ronald Stretton (1930–2012), British track cyclist
Ross Stretton (1952–2005), Australian ballet dancer and artistic director
Samuel Stretton (1731–1811), English builder and architect
Sempronius Stretton 1781–1842), British Army officer, known for sketches of Canadian life
Severus William Lynam Stretton (1783–1884), British Army officer
William Stretton (1755–1828), English builder and architect